Heaven's Vault is an archaeological science-fiction adventure game released by Inkle for Microsoft Windows and PlayStation 4 on April 16, 2019, and for Nintendo Switch on January 28, 2021.

Gameplay
In Heaven's Vault, the player takes the role of an archaeologist called Aliya Elasra who has a robotic companion called Six. The game follows the course of their adventure as they 'sail' between the moons of the Nebula searching for a missing roboticist called Janniqi Renba.

The player has to decipher and learn the hieroglyphic language of the Ancients, a lost civilization. This involves finding and collecting inscriptions from ancient artifacts, sites and ruins and translating and discussing texts with other characters.

The developers say that over a thousand words written in Ancient, the game's fictional language, can be found and say that its pictorial glyphs are inspired by Ancient Egyptian and Chinese writing systems.

The player can choose their own route through the story and around the Nebula as it employs a non-linear approach to narrative storytelling, allowing the player to make choices that impact the plot.

Reception

On its release, Heaven's Vault was met with "generally favourable" reviews from critics for Microsoft Windows, with an aggregate score of 76/100, and "mixed or average reviews" with an aggregate score of 71/100 for PlayStation 4 on Metacritic.

Music 
Laurence Chapman composed the soundtrack for the game. Chapman recruited Brookspeare Music for recording the strings. He also added subtle synth pads to as a reminder that Heaven's Vault is a science fiction game. Richard Brooker from Brookspeare Music also mixed the soundtrack.

Accolades

References

External links

2019 video games
Adventure games
Archaeology in popular culture
Nintendo Switch games
PlayStation 4 games
Science fiction video games
Video games about robots
Video games developed in the United Kingdom
Windows games
Single-player video games
Independent Games Festival winners